Pareuzebyella is a Gram-negative, aerobic, rod-shaped and non-motile genus of bacteria from the family of Flavobacteriaceae with one known species (Pareuzebyella sediminis). Pareuzebyella sediminis has been isolated from tidal flat sediments.

References

Flavobacteria
Bacteria genera
Monotypic bacteria genera
Taxa described in 2021